Angora is an unincorporated community in Rio Blanco County, in the U.S. state of Colorado.

History
Angora was founded sometime before 1907. The settlement was likely named for the Turkish city of Ankara, which was known archaically as Angora.

The post office in Rangely serves Angora addresses.

References

Unincorporated communities in Rio Blanco County, Colorado